Sea & Eugene & Shoo is the second studio album by South Korean girl group S.E.S., released through SM Entertainment on November 23, 1998. The record spawned the singles "Dreams Come True", "I Love You" and "Shy Boy", with the first two songs topping the domestic music program charts for multiple weeks.

Background 
Sea & Eugene & Shoo was released as the group's second album in November 1998. The album spawned three singles including "Dreams Come True", "I Love You", and "Shy Boy". The songs "Dreams Come True" and "Eternal Love" are 1998 covers of the 1996 tracks "Rakastuin mä looseriin" ("Like a Fool") and "Teflon love" ("Eternal Love") respectively, from the Finnish pop band Nylon Beat. Additionally, the album track "Feeling" is also a cover of their 1997 song "Veit multa frendin" ("Don't Disappoint Me").

Reception

Critical reception 
In an IZM review for Sea & Eugene & Shoo in October 2021, music critic Kim Seong-yeop wrote that "It is an album that builds on the mysterious fairy concept that is still considered a symbol of the group." He additionally noted that "They could have taken the safe route of following the youthful image of their debut song '(Cause) I'm your girl', but they were able to gain a differentiated edge in the battlefield of idol groups by trying experimental music with unique colors."

Commercial performance 
The album was commercially successful in South Korea, peaking at number one on the RIAK monthly album chart for two consecutive months in November and December 1998. In June 1999, it was reported that the album had sold more than 651,000 copies.

Track listing

Charts

Monthly charts

Sales

Accolades

References

External links 
 
 

1998 albums
S.E.S. (group) albums